International Meeting of Orthodox Youth (ITO), formerly known as European Orthodox Youth Reunion is an annual international religious meeting organized by several orthodox Christian students organizations (ASCOR, translation: Orthodox Christian Students Organization in Romania) in partnership with Romanian Orthodox Church and other Orthodox Churches. The first ITO meeting was held in Baia Mare in 2014.

List of meetings
Participants come from various countries (especially countries with significant orthodox Christian population) such as Romania, Moldova, Ukraine, Greece, Serbia, Albania, North Macedonia, France, Germany, Belgium, Italy, Spain, Portugal, Ireland, United Kingdom, Switzerland, Turkey, Jordan, Syria and some African countries.

See also
 Orthodox International Youth Festival "Bratya"

References

Eastern Orthodoxy in Romania
Festivals in Romania
Festivals established in 2014
Student religious organizations